Bonar Bridge Football Club is a Scottish football club based in the town of Bonar Bridge in the Scottish Highlands. They play in the North Caledonian League. 

Formed in 1968, they were regular members of the North Caledonian League for over thirty-five years before they dropped out in 2010 and fell into an extended period of abeyance.

The club was revived in 2019 with the intention of returning to the league. Their application was ratified at the League's AGM in July 2019.

Honours
North Caledonian Cup 
Winners: 1977–78, 1993–94

Morris Newton / SWL Cup 
Winners: 1993–94

References

North Caledonian Football League teams
Football clubs in Scotland
Sport in Sutherland
Association football clubs established in 1968
1968 establishments in Scotland
Football in Highland (council area)